My Man  or my man may refer to:

 A boyfriend or husband (German: Mein Mann)

Film
My Man (1928 film)
My Man (1996 film)
My Man (2014 film)

Music
"Mon Homme", song first sung by Mistinguett, popularized in English as "My Man" by Fanny Brice (and by Barbra Streisand playing Brice in Funny Girl)
"My Man (Understands)", a 1972 single by Tammy Wynette
"My Man", a 1974 song by the Eagles from On the Border
"My Man" (Luv' song), a 1977 single
"My Man" (Yoko Ono song), a 1982 single
"My Man" (Jade Ewen song), a 2009 single
"My Man", a song by They Might Be Giants from their 2001 album Mink Car
"My Man" (Tamar Braxton song), a 2017 single
 My Man (album)